The Logie for Most Popular Live Show was an award presented at the Australian TV Week Logie Awards. It was first awarded at the 8th Annual TV Week Logie Awards ceremony, held in 1966, as a replacement for the Most Popular Program category. However, this award category was eliminated in 1968 and the Most Popular Program category was reintroduced.

States

New South Wales

Queensland

South Australia

Tasmania

Victoria

References

Awards established in 1966